Bosque de Portugal is a public park located in the city of Curitiba, capital of the state of Paraná, Brazil.

See also 
 Curitiba

Parks in Curitiba